Sarah Clarke (born 1972) is an American actress.

Sarah Clarke may also refer to:

 Sarah Clarke (nun) (1919–2002), Irish nun and civil rights campaigner
 Sarah Clarke (journalist), Northern Irish journalist
 Sarah Clarke (cricketer) (born 1982), English cricketer
 Sarah Clarke (Black Rod) (born 1965), English administrator and Lady Usher of the Black Rod
 Sarah Anne Freeman Clarke, American painter 
 Sarah-Jane Clarke, Australian fashion designer
 Sarah Clarke (doctor), British doctor
 Sarah Clarke, Minneapolis attorney and wife of mayor Jacob Frey

See also
 Sarah Clark (disambiguation)